Francesco Peroschi or Camillus Peroschi was a Roman Catholic prelate who served as Bishop of Massa Marittima (1524–1529).

Biography
On 29 July 1524, Ventura Benassai was appointed during the papacy of Pope Clement VII as Bishop of Massa Marittima.
He served as Bishop of Massa Marittima until his resignation in 1529.

References

External links and additional sources
 (for Chronology of Bishops) 
 (for Chronology of Bishops) 

16th-century Italian Roman Catholic bishops
Bishops appointed by Pope Clement VII